South Korean singer-songwriter IU has released five studio albums, ten extended plays (EPs), 47 singles (including 19 as featured artist), five single albums, two remake albums and two compilation albums. In addition, the singer has collaborations and soundtracks for television series, films, and online games (including unreleased soundtracks).

The singer debuted with "Lost Child" in September 2008, which was released as the lead single for her debut EP Lost and Found (2008). The single and the EP failed to enter the charts until 2012 and were considered a failure by the singer herself. The singers first studio album Growing Up was released in April 2009 and supported through three singles—"Boo", "You Know" and "Marshmallow". Between late-2008 and January 2010, there were no official South Korean charts. With the foundation of the Gaon Music Chart in February 2010, the album debuted on  85 on its first issued week and later peaked at no. 6 in January 2012. In 2010, the singer released two singles; "Nagging" alongside Lim Seul-ong and "Good Day", which both peaked atop the Gaon Digital Chart and became two of the best-selling singles in South Korea, accumulating more than 4 million total sales.

Her second studio album Last Fantasy was released in November 2011 and was supported through the single "You & I". The album and the single debuted atop the South Korean charts with the album selling around 125,000 units and the single more than 6 million paid digital downloads, making it the second best-selling song in South Korea. IU's debut Japanese extended play I□U was released in December, debuting at no. 15 of the Oricon Albums Chart, selling about 12,000 copies. IU's fourth studio album Palette was released in April 2017 and supported through three singles; "Through the Night", "Can't Love You Anymore" and "Palette". The album debuted atop the Gaon Album Chart, selling a total of 97,000 copies. It became her first album to top the Billboard World Albums and peaked at no. 25 of the Top Heatseekers. Her ninth extended play Love Poem was released in November 2019. It debuted atop the Gaon Album Chart and became her best-selling album within two weeks, moving more than 160,000 physical copies. Love Poem was supported by two singles: "Love Poem" and "Blueming", both combined topping the charts for five weeks.

Over the course of her career, IU has sold over one million albums and more than 120 million paid digital downloads (with the sales of collaborative singles, soundtracks, album tracks, and other appearances included), making her the best selling female and solo artist of South Korea. IU has scored the most number one songs in Korea with a record-breaking 30 number-one songs on the Gaon Digital Chart and 18 on the Billboard K-pop Hot 100.

Albums

Studio albums

Compilation albums

Extended plays

Single albums

Singles

As lead artist

As featured artist

Soundtrack appearances

Promotional singles

Other charted songs

Other appearances

Footnotes

References

External links
 IU at Universal Music Japan 

Discographies of South Korean artists
Discography
K-pop discographies